Mirjana Šegrt (born 13 April 1950, in Dubrovnik) is a retired Croatian freestyle and butterfly swimmer who competed in the 1968 Summer Olympics for Yugoslavia. She was fifth in the 200 m and seventh in 100 m freestyle events. She also won three silver medals at the 1970 European Aquatics Championships.

References

1950 births
Living people
Yugoslav female swimmers
Croatian female swimmers
Sportspeople from Dubrovnik
Olympic swimmers of Yugoslavia
Swimmers at the 1968 Summer Olympics
Croatian female freestyle swimmers
Female butterfly swimmers
European Aquatics Championships medalists in swimming
Universiade medalists in swimming
Universiade gold medalists for Yugoslavia
Universiade silver medalists for Yugoslavia
Universiade bronze medalists for Yugoslavia
Medalists at the 1970 Summer Universiade